The Sacrifice Medal is a decoration that was created in 2008 as a replacement for the Wound Stripe. It is awarded by the Canadian monarch, usually by the Governor General of Canada, to members of the Canadian Forces or allied forces wounded or killed in action, and to members whose death under honourable circumstances is a result of injury or disease related directly to military service.

Design

The Sacrifice Medal is in the form of a  diameter silver disc topped by a St. Edward's Crown, symbolizing the Canadian monarch's role as the fount of honour. On the obverse is an effigy of the reigning sovereign and Commander-in-Chief of the Canadian Forces wearing a diadem of maple leaves and snowflakes, surrounded by the inscription ELIZABETH II DEI GRATIA REGINA CANADA (Elizabeth II, by the Grace of God, Queen of Canada). On the reverse is the word SACRIFICE alongside a depiction of the statue Mother Canada, one of Walter Seymour Allward's allegorical figures adorning the Canadian National Vimy Memorial in France. The recipient's name, along with his or her rank and service number for those in the military, is inscribed around the medal's edge.

This medallion is worn at the left chest, suspended on a 31.8mm wide ribbon coloured with vertical stripes in purposefully sombre red (recalling spilled blood), black (symbolizing grief and loss), and white (representative of both hope and peace). Should an individual already possessing a Sacrifice Medal be awarded the medal again for subsequent injuries, he or she is granted a medal bar—in silver with raised edges and bearing a maple leaf—for wear on the ribbon from which the original medal is suspended.

Eligibility
On 29 August 2008, Queen Elizabeth II, on the advice of her Cabinet under Prime Minister Stephen Harper, created the Sacrifice Medal to recognize any member of the Canadian Forces, soldier of an allied force, or a civilian working for the Canadian Forces, who after 7 October 2001 was killed or wounded under honourable circumstances and as a result of hostile action or perceived hostile action. If not fatal, the wound received must be serious enough to require attention from a medic, and the treatment must have been recorded in the individual's medical file. These tenets were later augmented when, on 19 October 2009, the Department of National Defence announced that all service related deaths would qualify for the Sacrifice Medal, whether as a result of direct hostile action or not.

See also
 Canadian order of precedence (decorations and medals)
 Elizabeth Cross
 Memorial Cross
 Memorial Plaque
 State decoration
 List of wound decorations

References

External links
 
 
 

Military awards and decorations of Canada
Wound decorations